Chile competed at the 2012 Summer Paralympics in London, United Kingdom from August 29 to September 9, 2012.

Chile won its first medal at this event.

Medallists

Athletics 

Men's Track and Road Events

Swimming

Women

Table tennis 

Men

Wheelchair Tennis

See also

 Chile at the 2012 Summer Olympics

References

Nations at the 2012 Summer Paralympics
2012
2012 in Chilean sport
Disability in Chile